Area codes 909 and 840 are telephone area codes in the North American Numbering Plan (NANP) for the far-eastern part of Los Angeles County and southwestern San Bernardino County in the U.S. state of California.

Area code 909 was split from area code 714 on November 14, 1992. By August 1993, dialing of the area code became mandatory. Western Riverside County was split off from 909 into area code 951 on July 17, 2004. 909 still covers small portions of Corona, Riverside, Moreno Valley, and the entire city of Calimesa which are in Riverside County.

Originally on the same date that 951 was split from 909, the geographic area retaining the 909 area code was to be overlaid by a new area code 752. However, lawsuits filed by the wireless industry in order to prevent California (and other states) from creating wireless-only area codes (after the creation of area code 917 in New York City), which would have identified all customers with certain area codes as being wireless, put all overlays in California on hold for years. In the meantime, number pooling was introduced, making the 752 overlay unnecessary, and 752 was returned to the NANPA numbering pool to be assigned at a later date. On July 23, 2019, the California Public Utilities Commission approved an all-service overlay for area code 909 with the new area code 840, since February 23, 2021. A permissive dialing period was implemented from July 2020 to January 2021. While 840 numbers are issued to new subscribers, those with 909 numbers retain them.

840 is California's 36th area code. With its establishment, one half of California's 24 geographic numbering plan areas (NPAs) implement overlay plans, while the other twelve are single-code NPAs.

Area code 909 is the second to the last new area code installed, with the digit 0 in the middle position. The rest of the original style area codes thereafter were 905 and the last of the N10 area codes that were allowed before the introduction of interchangeable NPA codes in 1995.

Service area

Los Angeles County
 Claremont
 Diamond Bar
 Glendora (mostly in the 626 area code)
 City of Industry (mostly in the 626 area code and small portion in the 562 area code)
 La Verne
 Pomona
 Rowland Heights (also in the 626 area code and small portion in the 562 area code)
 San Dimas 
 Walnut (small portion in the 626 area code)
 West Covina (mostly in the 626 area code)

Riverside County
 Calimesa
 Corona (mostly in the 951 area code)
 Eastvale (mostly in the 951 area code)

San Bernardino County

 Big Bear City
 Big Bear Lake
 Bloomington
 Blue Jay
 Chino Hills (small portion in the 657/714 area code)
 Chino
 Colton
 Crestline
 Fontana
 Grand Terrace
 Highland
 Lake Arrowhead
 Loma Linda
 Lytle Creek
 Mentone
 Montclair
 Muscoy
 Ontario
 Rancho Cucamonga
 Redlands
 Rialto
 Running Springs
 San Antonio Heights
 San Bernardino
 Sugarloaf
 Upland
 Yucaipa

See also
 List of California area codes
 List of NANP area codes
 North American Numbering Plan

References

External links
 North American Numbering Plan Administration

909
San Bernardino County, California
Riverside County, California
Inland Empire
Pomona Valley
San Bernardino, California
Telecommunications-related introductions in 1992
909